Alfonsina may refer to:

 Alfonsina (given name)
 Alfonsina (film), 1957 Argentine film
 Alfonsina's Airstrip, Mexican airstrip

See also
 
 
 Alfonsín (disambiguation)
Alfonsine, Italian comune
Alfonsino, species of fish
Alfonsine tables, astronomical table